This is a list of ships and classes of the Soviet Navy.

Corvettes 
In the Soviet Navy these were classified as small anti-submarine ships (MPK) or small missile ships (MRK).
  (projects 122A, 122bis)
  (project 204)
  (project 1124 Al'batros)
 Grisha I class (project 1124.1), 37 ships built in 1966–1982 
 Grisha II class (project 1124P, P stands for pogranichnyi – on the border), 20 ships built in 1972–1988
 Grisha III class (AK-630 CIWS-equipped variant)
 Grisha IV class (project 1124K)
 Grisha V class (project 1124M, sometimes noted as 1124.4)
  (project 1234 Ovod)
 Nanuchka I class
 Nanuchka II class (project 1234E)
 Nanuchka III class (project 1234.1)
 Nanuchka IV class (project 1234.7)
  (project 1239 Sivuch)
  (project 1240 Uragan, considered missile boats by NATO)
  (project 1241 Molniya, classified as large missile cutters)
 Tarantul I class (project 1241RE)
 Tarantul II class (project 1241.1)
 Tarantul III class (project 1124.1M)
 Pauk class (project 1241.2, anti-submarine corvette variant)
  (project 1331M)
 Parchim II class

Guardships 
In the Soviet Navy, frigates were classified as guard ships (SKR)
  (project 1135 Burevestnik)
 , "Watchful" (1970)
 , "Brisk" (1971)
 Svirepyy, "Fierce"(1971)
 , "Vigilant" (1972), involved in a mutiny in 1975, this incident inspired the novel The Hunt for Red October.
 Razyashchiy, "Smashing" (1973)
 , "Clever" (1974)
 , "Friendly" (1975)
 , "Virtuous" (1971)
 Doblestnyy, "Valourous" (1973)
 , "Active" (1973)
 Zharkiy, "Torrid" (1975)
  "Serene" (1978)
 , "Ardent" (1976)
 Leningradskiy Komsomolets (1976), "Leningrad Komsomol"; renamed Legkiy, "Light" in 1992.
 Letuchiy, "Flighty" (1977)
 Pylkiy, "Fervent" (1979)
 , "Passionate" (1979)
 Bezukoriznennyy, Irreproachable (1980)
 , "Harmonious" (1980)
 Poryvistyy, "Squally" (1980)
 Burevestnik M class (project 1135M Burevestnik)
 Rezvyy, "Frisky" (1975)
 Rezkiy, "Sharp" (1976)
 Grozyashchiy, "Threatening" (1977)
 Razitelnyy, "Striking" (1977)
 Neukrotimyy, "Untamable" (1978)
 Besmennyy, "Unchanging" (1979)
 Gordelivyy, "Proud" (1979)
 Gromkiy, "Loud" (1979)
 Revnostnyy, "Zealous" (1980)
 Ryanyy (1980)
 Pytlivyy (1982)
  (project 1166.1 Gepard)
 Tatarstan
 Dagestan
  (project 42 Sokol)
  (project 61, briefly)
 , "Ukrainian Komsomol" (1960)
 , "Astute" (1961)
 , "Agile" (1962)
 , "Talented" (1964)
 , "Exemplary" (1964)
 , "Courageous" (1964)
 , "Watchful" (1966)
  (project 1159 Del'fin)
  (project 35)
  (project 1154.0 Yastreb)
  (Fearless)
 
  (project 159)
  (project 50 Gornostay)
  (projects 2, 4, & 39)
  (project 29)

Gunboats 
 Krasnaya Abkhaziya
 Krasnaya Armeniya
 Krasnaya Gruziya
 
 Krasnyy Adzharistan

Destroyers 
 Aquila-class
Lovkiy (ex-Romanian)
Lyogkiy (ex-Romanian)
 
Komsomolets Ukrainy (1960)
 Soobrazitelnyy – Adaptable (1961)
 Provornyy – Agile (1962)
 Obraztsovyy – Exemplary (1964)
 Odarennyy – Gifted (1964)
 Otvazhnyy – Courageous (1964)
 Steregushchiy – Watchful (1966)
 Krasnyy Kavkaz (1966)
 Reshitelnyy – Decisive (1966)
 Strogiy – Severe (1967)
 Smetlivyy – Resourceful (1967)
 Krasnyy Krym (1969)
 Sposobnyy – Capable(1970)
 Skoryy – Fast (1971)
 Modified Kashin class
 Ognevoy – Fiery (1963)
 Slavnyy – Glorious (1965)
 Stroynyy – Harmonious (1965)
 Smyshlennyy – Humorous (1966)
 Smelyy – Valiant (1968)
 Sderzhannyy – Restrained (1972)
 Rajput (built for Indian Navy) (1980)
 Rana (built for Indian Navy) (1982)
 Ranjit (built for Indian Navy) (1983)
 Ranvir (built for Indian Navy) (1986)
 Ranvijay (built for Indian Navy) (1988)
  (Project 7 class)	
 
 	
 
 
 
 
  (Project 30 class)	
  (Project 7u class)
  (ex-Romanian)
 
 	
 
 Sovremennyy – Modern (1980)
 Otchayannyy – Foolhardy (1982)
 Otlichnyy – Perfect (or Excellent) (1983)
 Osmotritelnyy – Circumspect (1984)
 Bezuprechnyy – Irreproachable (1985)
 Boyevoy – Militant (1986)
 Stoykiy – Steadfast (1986)
 Okrylennyy – Inspiring (1987)
 Burnyy – Fiery (1988)
 Gremyashchiy – Thunderous (originally Vedushchiy) (1988)
 Bystryy – Quick (1989)
 Rastoropnyy – Prompt (1989)
 Bezboyaznennyy – Intrepid (1990)
 Bezuderzhnyy – Tenacious (1991)
 Bespokoynyy – Restless (1992)
 Nastoychivyy – Reliable (originally Moskovskiy Komsomolets) (1993)
 Besstrashnyy – Fearless (1994)
 Vazhnyy – Eminent (not completed)
 Vdumchivyy – Thoughtful (not completed)
  (on loan 1944–1952 from the UK)
  (HMS Churchill)
  (HMS Chelsea)
  (HMS Roxborough)
  (HMS St Albans)
  (HMS Lincoln)
  (HMS Brighton)
  (HMS Leamington)
  (HMS Richmond)
  (HMS Georgetown)
 Udaloy I class
 Udaloy – Bold(1980)
  (1980)
 Marshal Vasilevskiy (1982)
 Admiral Zakharov (1982)
  (1983)
  (1983)
  (1985)
 Severomorsk (1985)
  (1987)
  (1987)
 Admiral Kharlamov (1988)
  (1990)
 Udaloy II class
  (1995)
 Admiral Basistyy (not completed)
 Admiral Kucherov (not completed)

Cruisers 

  
 Tallinn (ex-Petropavlovsk, ex-German ) (1940–1960?)
  (1898–1945?)
 
 Komintern, ex-Pamyat Merkuriya
 
 Krasnyy Krym [Red Crimea] (Красный Крым), ex-Profintern
 Krasnyi Kavkaz
  (1937–1974?)
 Kirov (1937)
 Voroshilov
 
 Molotov
 Kalinin
 Kaganovich
 
  ( on loan 1944–1949 from the United States)
 , an upgrade to the Kirov class (1939–1981)
 , an enlargement of the Chapayev class (1949–1991)
 Sverdlov (Свердлов)
 Dzerzhinskiy (Дзержинский)
 Ordzhonikidze (Орджоникидзе)
 Zhdanov (Жданов)
 Aleksandr Nevskiy (Александр Невский)
 Admiral Nakhimov (Адмирал Нахимов)
 Admiral Ushakov (Адмирал Ушаков)
 Admiral Lazarev (Адмирал Лазарев)
 Aleksander Suvorov (Александр Суворов)
 Admiral Senyavin (Адмирал Сенявин)
 Dmitriy Pozharskiy (Дмитрий Пожарский)
 Oktyabrskaya Revolutsiya (Октябрьская Революция)
 Murmansk (Мурманск)'''
 Mikhail Kutuzov (Михаил Кутузов) 
  – Terrible (Грозный)
  (Адмирал Фокин)
  (Адмирал Головко)
  (Варяг)
 
 
 
 Vladivostok Sevastopol 
 Kronshtadt Admiral Isakov Admiral Nakhimov Admiral Makarov Marshal Voroshilov Admiral Oktyabrskiy 
 
 
 Admiral Yumashev 
  (1969)
  (1972)
  (1972)
  (1973)
 Petropavlovsk (1974)
 Tashkent (1975)
 Vladivostok (1976)
  –  a non-nuclear, reduced-size version of the Kirov battlecruisers
 , renamed , sunk in 2022.
 
 Chervona Ukraina, renamed 
  later taken over by Ukraine as  – incomplete

 Coastal defence ships 

 Amphibious assault 

 
 
 
 Ivan Rogov Aleksandr Nikolayev Mitrofan Moskalenko 

Battlecruisers 

 Battleships 

Aircraft carriers/Aviation cruisers

Submarines 
List of Soviet and Russian submarine classes
 D type L type ShCh type P type S type M type K type A (AG) type Kalev class (ex-Estonian) 
 Lembit
 Kalev
  (ex-Latvian)
 
 
 S class (on loan 1944 from the UK)
 V-1 (HMS Sunfish)
 U class (on loan 1944–1950 from the UK)
 V-2 (HMS Unbroken)
 V-3 (HMS Unison)
 V-4 (HMS Ursula)
 TS-1 (ex-Romanian NMS Rechinul)
 TS-2 (ex-Romanian NMS Marsuinul)
 TS-3 (ex-Romanian NMS Delfinul)
 CB-class (ex-Italian, ex-Romanian)

 SS/SSK 
 
 
 
 
  
  (?-1962)
 B-427  (1971–1994)
 
 
 Novorossiysk
 Rostov-na-Donu
 Staryy Oskol
 Krasnodar
 Velikiy Novgorod
 Kolpino
 
 
 Sankt Peterburg
 Kronshtadt
 Velikiye Luki

 SSB 
 Zulu IV class - SSB conversion
 Golf II class
  (?-1968), famous as target of CIA recovery operation using the Hughes Glomar Explorer

 SSG 
 Whiskey class Twin Cylinder
 Whiskey class Long Bin
  (1962–1994)
  (?-1994)

 SSA (auxiliary) 
 
 
 
 

 SSN 
  (1958-?)
  (1958–1988)
  (1960–1970)
  (1963–1989)
 Victor I class
 Victor II class
 Victor III class
 
 , a successor to the Alfa class
 K-278 Komsomolets (?-1989)
 Sierra I class
 Sierra II class
 Akula I/Bars class
 Akula II class

 SSBN 
 
  (1959–1991)
  (1969–1990)
 K-55 (1962–?)
 K-178 (1962–?)
 K-40 (1962–1990)
 K-16 (1963–1990)
 K-145 (1963–?)
 K-149 (1964–1990)
 Yankee I class
 K-140 Leninets K-26 
 K-32 
 K-216 
 K-207 
 K-210 
 K-249 
 K-253 
 K-395 
 K-408 
 K-411 
 K-418 
 K-420 
 K-423 
 K-426 
 K-415 
 K-403 
 K-245 
 K-214 
 K-219 
 K-228 
 K-241 
 K-444 
 K-399 
 K-434 
 K-236 
 K-389 
 K-252 
 K-258 
 K-446 
 K-451 
 K-436 K-430 Yankee II class (1968-?)
 Yankee Sidecar class conversion
 Yankee Pod class conversion
 Yankee Stretch class conversion
  (?-1986)
 Delta I class
 Delta II class
 Delta III class
 K-129
 Delta IV class
  (1981-)
 Dmitriy Donskoy
 Borey class
 Yuriy Dolgorukiy
 Aleksandr Nevskiy
 Vladimir Monomakh
 Knyaz Vladimir

 SSGN 
 Echo I class
 Echo II class
 
 
 K-222 (1970–1988)
 Yankee Notch class conversion
 Charlie I class
 Charlie II class
 Oscar I class
 Oscar II class
 K-141  (?-2002)
 Yasen class
 Severodvinsk
 Kazan
 Novosibirsk
 Krasnoyarsk

 SSAN (auxiliary) 
 

 Others 
  (1962–1981)
 
 

Other
 SSV-33 (Pacific Fleet communications ship, based upon the  battlecruiser hull)
  (Commissioned as a ship and used as one).
 VMF Kommuna is a salvage vessel, and having been launched in 1915, one of the oldest naval vessels still in service in a major navy of the world.
  a tall ship built in Italy as the Cristoforo Colombo and acquired as war reparation.
 STS Sedov tall ship built as Magdalene Vinnen II  also acquired as war reparation.
 Marshal Nedelin class missile range instrumentation/space event support ship
 Onega class acoustic trials ships
 Potok/Modified T-58 class weapons trials ship
 T-43 class acoustic trials ships

Missile and munitions transports
 Sadko class
 Amga class
 Lama class
 Muna class

Electronic surveillance ships
 Balzam class
 Okean class (modified trawler)
 Primor'ye class (modified fish factory ships)
 Vishnya class
 Yug class
 Alpinist class

Oceanographic research ships
 Nikolay Zubov class (AGOR & AGI)
 Sibirykov class 
 Yug class

Survey ships
 Moma class (AGS)
 Samara class (AGS)
 Finik class
 Biya class
 Kamenka class
 Vinograd'' class

See also 
List of ships of World War II

References

External links 
 Andrew Toppan's Haze Gray & Underway

 
Soviet Navy
Russian and Soviet military-related lists